The Gardens at the Springs Preserve, is an  desert botanical garden located in Las Vegas, Nevada. The gardens are currently located in the Las Vegas Springs Preserve at 333 S. Valley View Blvd.

Designed to teach water conservation through water-efficient landscaping, the Gardens offers free classes, demonstrations and expert advice.

History 

Located at 3701 West Alta Drive, the  Kiwanis Water Conservation Park opened in 1982 and contained over 300 species of desert-compatible plants arranged in a dozen gardens.  The park was constructed on land donated by the Las Vegas Valley Water District. In 1986 the water district developed a master plan for the park.  Following renovations to implement the master plan, the park was renamed and reopened in 1990 as the Desert Demonstration Gardens.

The Demonstration Gardens closed in early 2007 to facilitate moving to the new location. At the time, the site contained over 1,200 species of plants mostly from the deserts of the southwest.

The gardens reopened on June 8, 2007 at the Springs Preserve.

See also 
 List of botanical gardens in the United States

References

External links 
official Gardens at the Las Vegas Springs Preserve website

Botanical gardens in Nevada
Parks in Clark County, Nevada
North American desert flora
Tourist attractions in the Las Vegas Valley